Jairo Cubillos (born 20 August 1954) is a Colombian long-distance runner. He competed in the marathon at the 1976 Summer Olympics.

References

1954 births
Living people
Athletes (track and field) at the 1975 Pan American Games
Athletes (track and field) at the 1976 Summer Olympics
Colombian male long-distance runners
Colombian male marathon runners
Olympic athletes of Colombia
Place of birth missing (living people)
Pan American Games competitors for Colombia
20th-century Colombian people